The  was a prototype Bo-Bo-Bo wheel arrangement multi-voltage AC/DC electric locomotive formerly operated by JR Freight in Japan.

Intended as a prototype for a new fleet of high-power electric locomotives to haul freight trains northward from Tokyo to Hokkaido, the sole member of the class, EF500-901, was built jointly by Kawasaki Heavy Industries and Mitsubishi Electric, and delivered to Shin-Tsurumi Depot in August 1990. The design was broadly based on the Class EF200 locomotives built for Tokaido Main Line freight duties west of Tokyo. Following initial test-running, the locomotive underwent long-term feasibility testing on freight services on the Tohoku Main Line. However, the locomotive fell foul of newly introduced government guidelines covering high-frequency electromagnetic noise emissions, and so fleet production was deemed unfeasible. JR Freight instead opted for the Class EH500 and Class EF510 locomotive designs.

EF500-901 was transferred to Sendai Depot in 1996, but subsequently saw little use. It was formally withdrawn on 29 March 2002. The locomotive is stored at JR Freight's Hiroshima Depot.

Classification

The EF500 classification for this locomotive type is explained below. As with previous locomotive designs, the prototype is numbered EF500-901.
 E: Electric locomotive
 F: Six driving axles
 500: AC/DC locomotive with AC motors

See also
 JR Freight Class ED500, another experimental electric locomotive

References

1500 V DC locomotives
20 kV AC locomotives
Electric locomotives of Japan
Bo-Bo-Bo locomotives
1067 mm gauge locomotives of Japan
Kawasaki locomotives
Railway locomotives introduced in 1990
Preserved electric locomotives
Individual locomotives of Japan
Multi-system locomotives